Charles Becker  (1870–1915) was a New York City police officer convicted of murder.

Charles Becker, or Charlie Becker, may also refer to:
Charles Becker (politician) (1840–1908), German-American politician from Illinois
Charlie Becker (1887–1968), German-American actor
Charlie Becker (baseball) (1890–1928), American Major League Baseball pitcher